Alessio Innocenti (born 4 February 1993) is an Argentine footballer who plays for F.C. Cinisello.

The central midfielder played previously for Argentine side Estudiantes La Plata and the Italian clubs Pro Vercelli, Barletta in the Lega Pro Prima Divisione and F.C. Südtirol on loan from Milan.

References

External links
 
 

Living people
1993 births
Italian footballers
Argentine footballers
Association football midfielders
A.C. Milan players
A.S.D. Barletta 1922 players
F.C. Südtirol players
Estudiantes de La Plata footballers
Slovenian PrvaLiga players
F.C. Pro Vercelli 1892 players
Italian expatriate footballers
Italian expatriate sportspeople in Slovenia
Expatriate footballers in Slovenia
ND Gorica players
Acqui U.S. 1911 players
Footballers from Buenos Aires